Chishui may refer to:

Rivers and city
Chishui River (赤水河), a major tributary of the Yangtze
Chishui City (赤水市), Guizhou
Chishui River (Shaanxi), a tributary of the Wei River in Shaanxi
Jishui River (急水溪), also romanised Chishui, in Tainan, Taiwan

Towns (赤水镇)
Chishui, Dehua County, Fujian
Chishui, Zhangping, Fujian
Chishui, Guangdong, in Kaiping
Chishui, Jiangxi, in Guangchang County
Chishui, Shaanxi, in Hua County
Chishui, Sichuan, in Xuyong County